Herculanils (???-180) was an early Christian saint. His feast day in Roman Catholicism is September 5.

References

Early Christianity